Carabhydrus is a genus of beetles in the family Dytiscidae, containing the following species:

 Carabhydrus andreas Zwick, 1981
 Carabhydrus monteithi Watts, 1978
 Carabhydrus mubboonus Larson & Storey, 1994
 Carabhydrus niger Watts, 1978
 Carabhydrus plicatus Watts, 1978

References

Dytiscidae genera